Hamed Said Al-Khatri (born May 24, 1985) is an Omani sport shooter. He competed at the 2016 Summer Olympics in the men's 50 metre rifle three positions event, in which he placed 43rd. He was the flag bearer for Oman at the Parade of Nations.

References

External links
 

1985 births
Living people
Omani male sport shooters
Olympic shooters of Oman
Shooters at the 2016 Summer Olympics
Shooters at the 2010 Asian Games
Shooters at the 2014 Asian Games
Shooters at the 2018 Asian Games
Asian Games competitors for Oman
Shooters at the 2020 Summer Olympics
21st-century Omani people